Trevor Alfred Charles Jones (born 23 March 1949) is a South African composer of film and television scores. Having spent much of his career in the United Kingdom, Jones has worked on numerous well-known and acclaimed films including Excalibur, Runaway Train, The Dark Crystal, Labyrinth, Mississippi Burning, The Last of the Mohicans, and In the Name of the Father; collaborating with filmmakers like John Boorman, Andrei Konchalovsky, Jim Henson, and Michael Mann. He has composed for numerous films and his music has been critically acclaimed for both its depth and emotion, and he has been nominated for two Golden Globe Awards and three BAFTA Awards for Best Film Music.

Career
At the age of six, Jones already had decided to become a film composer. In 1967 he attended the Royal Academy of Music in London with a scholarship and afterwards worked for five years for the BBC on reviews of radio and television music. In 1974 Jones attended the University of York from which he graduated with a master's degree in Film and Media Music. At the National Film and Television School Jones studied for three years on general film-making and film and sound techniques. During this time he wrote the music for twenty-two student projects. In 1981 Jones wrote the score for the Academy Award-winning short movie The Dollar Bottom and for the short Black Angel.

Jones was soon after brought to the attention of John Boorman, who was in the midst of making his Arthurian epic, Excalibur (1981). Although mostly tracked with classical music by Richard Wagner and Carl Orff, Boorman also needed original dramatic cues (as well as period music) for certain scenes. Given Excalibur'''s modest budget, a "name" composer was out of the question, so Boorman commissioned the up-and-coming young Jones.Excalibur brought Jones to the attention of Jim Henson, who was making The Dark Crystal (1982), and looking for a composer who was young and eager to work in the experimental, free-wheeling way which Henson preferred. The resultant score is an expansive, multi-faceted work, featuring the London Symphony Orchestra, augmented by inventive use of Fairlight and Synclavier synthesizers, as well as period instruments like crumhorn, recorder, and the unusual double-flageolet, which Jones came across by chance in a music store.

Jones followed Excalibur with scores for the horror films The Appointment (1981) and The Sender (1982), and the pirate adventure Savage Islands (1983). In 1985 Jones composed one of his best scores, for the acclaimed television production The Last Place on Earth.

Jones reunited with Henson for the 1986 fantasy musical Labyrinth. David Bowie wrote and performed the vocal tracks for this movie, including the hit "Underground", while Jones provided the dramatic score.

Reflecting that his complex, symphonic score for The Dark Crystal garnered little notice, Jones began to re-think his entire approach to dramatic scoring. Around the mid-80s, Jones' work became more electronic-based (much like fellow film composer Maurice Jarre), eschewing identifiable themes in favor of mood-enhancing synth chords and minimalist patterns. While he wrote a somber, chamber orchestra score in 1988 for Dominick and Eugene (which featured classical guitarist John Williams), scores like Angel Heart (1987), Mississippi Burning (1988) and Sea of Love (1989) are more typical of Jones' output during this period.

Jones' return to large-orchestra scoring came with 1990s Arachnophobia, and he provided a light-hearted Georges Delerue-flavoured score for Blame it on the Bellboy in 1992.

Jones' most popular success came later in 1992 with his score for The Last of the Mohicans, and his soaring, passionate music belies the difficulties which afflicted its creation. Director Michael Mann initially asked Jones to provide an electronic score for the film, but late in the game, it was decided an orchestral score would be more appropriate for this historic epic. Jones hurried to re-fashion the score for orchestra in the limited time left, while the constant re-cutting of the film meant music cues sometimes had to be rewritten several times to keep up with the new timings. Finally, with the release date looming, composer Randy Edelman was called in to score some minor scenes which Jones did not have time to do. Jones and Edelman received co-credit on the film (thus making this very popular and acclaimed score ineligible for Oscar consideration). Although all were displeased with the circumstances, Jones was not fired from the film despite reports to the contrary.

Jones became active in television in the 1990s, with orchestral scores for several Hallmark productions, including Gulliver's Travels, Merlin and Cleopatra. He also provided a fun, jazzy, 1930s-style score for Richard III (1995), which features a swing-band setting of Christopher Marlowe's The Passionate Shepherd to His Love. In 1997 Jones worked for the first time with Ridley Scott, providing an electronic/orchestral/rock-flavoured soundtrack for G.I. Jane (1997).

Discography
Film

Television

Video gamesMarvel Nemesis: Rise of the Imperfects (2005)

Influences
Max Steiner, Elmer Bernstein, Maurice Jarre, John Barry

Personal life
He is married to Victoria Seale and has four children. His South-African born uncle, the actor Norman Florence, together with his aunt Rhoda Florence and his cousin Peter Florence, founded the Hay Festival in 1988, which Jones has attended almost every year since its inception.

References

Selected bibliography
Cooper, David, Christopher Fox & Ian Sapiro (eds.), CineMusic? Constructing the Film Score, Cambridge Scholars Publishing, 2008. Book page on publisher's website
Sapiro, Ian & David Cooper, "Spotting, Scoring, Soundtrack: The Evolution of Trevor Jones's Score for Sea of Love", 17-32 in CineMusic? Constructing the Film Score, edited by David Cooper, Christopher Fox & Ian Sapiro. Cambridge Scholars Publishing, 2008.
Cooper, David, Ian Sapiro & Laura Anderson, The Screen Music of Trevor Jones: Technology, Process, Production'', Abingdon, Routledge, 2020. Book page on publisher's website.

External links

The Professional Career and Output of Trevor Jones, University of Leeds

1949 births
Alumni of the University of York
Alumni of the National Film and Television School
Black composers
La-La Land Records artists
Living people
Male film score composers
Musicians from Cape Town
South African film score composers
Varèse Sarabande Records artists
South African people of Welsh descent